Gol he, also called choṭī he, is one of the two variants of the Arabic letter he/hāʾ (ه) that are in use in the Urdu alphabet, the other variant being the do-cas͟hmī he, also called hā-'e-mak͟hlūt. The letter is named for its shape in the isolated form, gol meaning "round" in Hindustani, to distinguish it from the do-cas͟hmī he, which is really a calligraphic variant of the "two-eyed" regular he in the medial position. Its various non-isolated forms originated in the Nastaʿlīq script or calligraphic hand, though various zigzag (medial) and hook (final) forms of hāʾ have existed before the script was developed.

Use in Urdu

For comparison, the do-cas͟hmī he (not used word-initially) and the regular Arabic letter:

See also
Nastaʿlīq script

References

Arabic letters
Persian letters
Persian calligraphy
Urdu calligraphy